Roger Dean Miller Jr. (born October 15, 1965) is an American country singer, known professionally as Dean Miller. He is the son of Roger Miller, a country pop artist who had several hit singles from the 1960s through the 1980s. Dean Miller has recorded three studio albums (one of which was not released), in addition to charting four singles on the Hot Country Songs charts and writing singles for Trace Adkins and Terri Clark. His highest-peaking single was "Nowhere, USA", which reached No. 54 in 1997. He has had many songs recorded by artists including George Jones, Trisha Yearwood, and Jamey Johnson.

Biography
Although born in Los Angeles, Dean Miller was also raised in Santa Fe, New Mexico and San Antonio, Texas. He got his musical start in local clubs around Santa Fe, before moving back to Los Angeles in the early 1980s and joining a band called the Sarcastic Hillbillies. At the same time, he attended college, in addition to briefly pursuing a career in acting. Miller later moved to Nashville, Tennessee, where he worked as a staff songwriter for Sony/Tree Publishing, and later various other staff songwriter positions.

By 1995, he was signed to the Nashville division of Capitol Records Nashville. Two years later, his eponymous debut album was released on the Capitol label. The lead-off single "Nowhere, USA" received significant airplay in Chicago even before its release date; however, it and two additional singles failed to reach Top 40 on the Billboard Hot Country Singles & Tracks (now Hot Country Songs) charts. Another single, "Wake Up and Smell the Whiskey", was co-written and previously recorded by Brett James, who would later become a popular Nashville songwriter in the 2000s. Miller parted ways with Capitol not long afterward. In 2000, two country artists charted with singles that Miller co-wrote: Terri Clark's "A Little Gasoline" and Trace Adkins's "I'm Gonna Love You Anyway".

In 2002, Miller signed to the newly formed Universal South Records, where he recorded his second album, Just Me. The lead-off single "Love Is a Game" peaked at No. 58, but the album was never released. Universal also released a rendition of "Old Toy Trains", which Roger had written for Dean when he was two years old; this version included Roger's vocals dubbed in on the chorus. Miller later left Universal South's roster as well.

Miller signed to the country music division of Koch Entertainment in 2005. His third album, titled Platinum, was released that same year. This album included the track "Right Now", which the band Rushlow had previously recorded as the title track of their 2003 debut album, as well as the non-charting single "Hard Love". Koch Entertainment closed its country division in 2005, however, and Miller was yet again without a record deal.

Discography

Studio albums

Extended plays

Singles

Music videos

References

External links
Official website

1965 births
American country singer-songwriters
Living people
Musicians from Los Angeles
Capitol Records artists
MNRK Music Group artists
Singer-songwriters from California
Country musicians from California